Slammer Whammers were a brand of Milk caps made by the Los Angeles-based company Imperial Toy Corporation, in the 1990s. They were one of the leading brands of pogs during the milk cap craze that swept Canada, the United States and the United Kingdom in 1994–5.

Product 

The standard Slammer Whammers product was a blister pack containing 24 milkcaps and 2 slammers. Imperial Toy Corp. released various sets of milkcaps under the Slammer Whammers name, for example Biker Bugs, Wise Guys, Skull Squad and Wild Things.

There were 288 slammer whammers to collect. This 288 set comprised 12 individual sets of 24 caps to collect. There were also sets of 24 caps that were not part of the 288 big set (for example Dino Dudes, Ink Drops, Pure Poison, Cyberdudes, Mini Monsters and Splatter Bugs).

In 2006, Funrise Toy Corporation relaunched their brand of pogs, so Imperial Toy Corp. decided to revive "Slammer Whammers". The motive behind this move was that if pogs became popular again like in 1994, Imperial Toy Corp. would be ready with their product already in the marketplace.

External links 
 Imperial Toy Corporation
 Images of the 288 set of Slammer Whammers

Collectible-based games
1990s toys